Hedije Biçaku Maliqi (born 23 May 1924) is an Albanian historian and partisan woman who survived the Massacre of 1951 in Albania.

Early life 
Bicaku was born in May 1924 in Elbasan. Together with her older sister, Semije Sejdini, daughter of Qani Bicaku, granddaughter of Aqif Pasha Elbasani, both attended the "Queen Mother Pedagogical Institute". They were just two sisters after their father was put in prison by the Young Turks because he was dealing with the national issue and the protection of the Albanian language. There he fell ill and died, leaving his orphaned daughters. Although they came from the most famous patriotic and noble family, the two sisters behaved just like other girls. During the time of the lessons, Didi was also involved in sports, sliding on skates through the streets of Tirana.

Education 

After finishing school in 1947, Didi was appointed a teacher in the village of Paftal in Berat. A teaching lesson with students also opens against illiteracy, courses for tailoring. Differences continue even in the city of Berat, saying a team with a volleyball girl to participate in the national spartan and during the competition they come first. After two years of work, they fire her after her uncle is put in prison. She goes to complain and starts working at an Albanian Red Cross pharmacy, but she was fired again.

Massacre of 1951 
In 1951, they lived together with their mother and their sister's husband, the prominent lawyer Fejzo Sejdini, at the house of Bajram Curri's daughter. After midnight, on that very cold night of February 23, there was a loud knock on the door, three armed security soldiers rushed in and with the list in their hands they read the names of the family members. When they read the name Didi Bicaku, they say: "In the name of the people, you are under arrest! Hands up!" They check the house from corner to corner, her sister, Semija was sitting on the couch, down there was the English language book that Didi was learning and they were not supposed to see it because foreign languages were forbidden. She stood proud, shocked, without tears in her eyes, put on her thick coat, her sister's husband threw a large woolen scarf over her shoulders, and security took her handcuffed. They pushed her to "Skënderbej" Square, where hundreds of others had gathered, threatened by the weapons of those who guarded them, and walked towards the New Prison.

At the prison door, Didi waited for almost two hours, they had to enter one by one. She went through the big gate, then the next gate, they pushed her to a dungeon door. There were many people in there and it was completely dark. She met there Sabiha Kasimati who unfortunately was executed by firing squad in 1951. They were the only two females prisoners.

Later life 
After leaving prison, Biçaku worked as a seamstress, later as a construction worker and received the sixth grade. She married into the Maliqi family, patriotic people who worked and fought for the Independence of Albania. She lives in Tirana and had two children.

References 

1924 births
Living people
20th-century Albanian historians
People from Elbasan
Queen Mother Pedagogical Institute alumni
Prisoners and detainees of Albania
Albanian resistance members